Nabokov is a surname. Notable people with the surname include:

 Vladimir Vladimirovich Nabokov (1899–1977),  Russian-American author, entomologist, and chess problem composer
 Vladimir Dmitrievich Nabokov (1870–1922), Russian criminologist, journalist, and liberal politician, and father of Vladimir Vladimirovich Nabokov
 Nicolas Nabokov (1903–1978), Russian-American composer, cousin of Vladimir Vladimirovich Nabokov
 Dmitri Nabokov (1934–2012), singer and author, son of Vladimir Vladimirovich Nabokov 
 Evgeni Nabokov, a retired professional ice hockey goaltender

Russian-language surnames